"Other Lives" is the fifth episode of the second season of the American anthology crime drama television series True Detective. It is the 13th overall episode of the series and was written by series creator Nic Pizzolatto, and directed by John Crowley. It was first broadcast on HBO in the United States on July 19, 2015.

The season is set in California, and focuses on three detectives, Ray Velcoro (Colin Farrell), Ani Bezzerides (Rachel McAdams) and Paul Woodrugh (Taylor Kitsch), from three cooperating police departments and a criminal-turned-businessman named Frank Semyon (Vince Vaughn) as they investigate a series of crimes they believe are linked to the murder of a corrupt politician. In the episode, the aftermath of the shootout impacts the lives of Velcoro, Bezzerides and Woodrugh, while Semyon keeps expanding his empire and investigating his own henchmen.

According to Nielsen Media Research, the episode was seen by an estimated 2.42 million household viewers and gained a 1.0 ratings share among adults aged 18–49. The episode received mixed reviews from critics, who praised the "soft reboot" and new narrative, while others considered that it arrived too late in the season.

Plot
Two months after the shootout, deemed the "Vinci Massacre" by the media, Attorney General Geldof (C. S. Lee) closes Caspere's case, deeming his death as part of the Amarilla's activities and announces his bid for Governor. Velcoro (Colin Farrell) has quit the police and now works in private security for Semyon (Vince Vaughn). 

Bezzerides (Rachel McAdams) now works at the sheriff's office evidence lock-up and is forced to attend sexual harassment seminars, where some of her co-workers continue making comments about her. Woodrugh (Taylor Kitsch) has been promoted to detective in the fraud department and is settling the case with Lacey Lindel (Ashley Hinshaw), while also intending to marry Emily (Adria Arjona). While visiting Cynthia (Lolita Davidovich), he discovers that she spent the $20,000 he earned in the War of Afghanistan and angrily confronts her as he needed the money for his family. Cynthia admits it but also claims to know about his gay sexual encounters, and he storms out.

Velcoro fighting for Chad's legal custody and is dismayed when he finds that Gena (Abigail Spencer) asked for a paternity test. Needing the money, he asks Semyon for a new job and is assigned to watch over his right-hand man, Blake Churchman (Christopher James Baker), as he feels he can't trust him anymore. Velcoro follows Blake, who meets with Dr. Pitlor (Rick Springfield) to pick up girls at his offices and then deliver them to Osip (Timothy V. Murphy), with the help of Tony Chessani (Vinicius Machado).

While working on Vera's case, Bezzerides finds a connection between her and the cache of blue diamonds found in Caspere's safe deposit box. She asks Velcoro for help but he warns her to stay away from the case, as they are no longer detectives. Nevertheless, Katherine Davis (Michael Hyatt) secretly re-opens the case, as she suspects Geldof is working with Chessani (Ritchie Coster) to help his bid. She convinces Velcoro to join them, intending to help him win the legal custody. However, she also reveals that he is not investigated as Gena's rapist was caught just a few weeks ago, making Velcoro realize that Semyon lied to him years ago. Semyon also talks with Jordan (Kelly Reilly) as their relationship seems to be dwindling. She states that for years, she suspected she could be infertile, which explains why they could never have children despite their many tries. This prompts Semyon to spend more time with her as they look for other methods.

Velcoro confronts Dr. Pitlor for his connections with Chessani and Caspere, brutally attacking him at his office. Pitlor confesses to modeling the girls for parties that were organized by Chessani and Caspere, with Tony also acting as a pimp. They invited many rich people to the parties and used hard drives as possible blackmail for their own purposes, one of them involving rail-line businessman Jacob McCandless (Jon Lindstrom). He also confirms to having treated Chessani's previous wife in a psychiatric hospital though methods that led to her suicide.

Needing access to the parties, Bezzerides asks Athena (Leven Rambin) for help in getting inside. Woodrugh asks many diamond owners about Caspere's blue diamonds. An owner states the diamonds might be stolen and reveals that Detective Dixon (W. Earl Brown) already asked for information regarding the diamonds before his death and even before they discovered the safe deposit box. Later, he and Bezzerides arrive at a house in Guerneville, from where Vera supposedly called. Near the house, they find a shed, where evidence points to torture having taken place. In their house, Semyon and Jordan spend some time together when someone knocks at their door. Semyon answers, finding Velcoro, who needs to talk with him.

Production

Development
In June 2015, the episode's title was revealed as "Other Lives" and it was announced that series creator Nic Pizzolatto had written the episode while John Crowley had directed it. This was Pizzolatto's thirteenth writing credit, and Crowley's first directing credit.

Reception

Viewers
The episode was watched by 2.42 million viewers, earning a 1.0 in the 18-49 rating demographics on the Nielson ratings scale. This means that 1 percent of all households with televisions watched the episode. This was a slight increase from the previous episode, which was watched by 2.36 million viewers with a 1.1 in the 18-49 demographics.

Critical reviews
"Other Lives" received mixed reviews from critics. The review aggregator website Rotten Tomatoes reported a 54% approval rating for the episode, based on 24 reviews, with an average rating of 6.3/10. The site's consensus states: "'Other Lives' succeeds in rebooting the characters of True Detective, but it might come too late in the season to create new tension."

Matt Fowler of IGN gave the episode a "great" 8.2 out of 10 and wrote in his verdict, "While I like the fact that our heroes had to take a step back in order to move forward, and that the dots are finally starting to connect with regards to the larger conspiracy, everything that's coming back is doing so somewhat unspectacularly. We knew the missing girl was a part of this. And Dr. Pitlor. And Dixon. Despite the big action set piece from last week, the swimming pool still needs to be shocked."

Erik Adams of The A.V. Club gave the episode a "C" grade and wrote, "The lead story of the episode is a little bit of history repeating: Just as season one followed the demise of Reggie Ledoux with some fast forwarding and second guessing, season two jumps forward from the so-called 'Vinci massacre' to start raising questions of its own. The circumstances are strikingly similar, but following the first rounds of True Detective and Fargo, the surprise of 'Other Lives' is muted. And with the same thing happening at the same point in the season, it's almost as if the episode is arguing for a do-over on a signature element of season one." 

Alan Sepinwall of HitFix wrote, "There are some developments and moments in 'Other Lives' that I found promising, but that I would have found a whole lot more promising if I hadn't made it through the previous four chapters without finding many characters or stories worth caring about." Gwilym Mumford of The Guardian wrote, "Last week's bloody shootout seems to have done the trick: Nic Pizzolatto's faltering drama has burst back into life." Ben Travers of IndieWire gave the episode a "C-" grade and wrote, "We watched a shoddily-constructed hour of television with edits trying to mask bloated dialogue and more unfounded match cuts from convenient props to California's skyline/roads. When (or if) we look back on the season, 'Our Lives' will be the episode we all forget — or at least wish we could."

Jeff Jensen of Entertainment Weekly wrote, "I'm not sure the drama was all that improved, and the dialogue was never more ridiculous, but at least 'Other Lives' left you feeling like you were getting somewhere. Including the end." Aaron Riccio of Slant Magazine wrote, "Ironically, even though 'Other Lives' hints at the different lives its characters could experience at any given moment, it chooses to enmesh them even deeper in the ones they've unwittingly chosen." 

Kenny Herzog of Vulture gave the episode a 4 star rating out of 5 and wrote, "The debate that will continue to rage has more to do with how Pizzolatto and his rotating crew of directors (this time noted theater director John W. Crowley) and co-writers have walked the line between subtly reconstituting genre tropes and haphazardly evoking them in earnest. Unless one would rather kibitz with Ani over the merits of length versus girth." Tony Sokol of Den of Geek gave the episode a 4 star rating out of 5 and wrote, "While cops go over the spent shrapnel at the city block-wide crime scene, the surviving squad members are as scattered as the buck shot that knocked Detective Ray Velcoro on his ass at the end of episode 2." 

Carissa Pavlica of TV Fanatic gave the episode a 4 star rating out of 5 and wrote, "Overall, it's not easy to care too deeply about a case about corporate big wigs, sexual perversion and getting themselves caught on camera turning to murder, diamonds and collusion. It's a lot to drink in, so tying it in well with the protagonists is really important. They just started doing that with any meaning during this hour. Can it all come together in three more episodes? We'll find out." Shane Ryan of Paste gave the episode a 5.9 out of 10 and wrote, "True Detective has become a one-trick pony, and that's too bad, but man... what a trick."

References

External links
 "Other Lives" at HBO
 

2015 American television episodes
True Detective episodes
Television episodes written by Nic Pizzolatto